Karawang (Kota Karawang or Karawang Kota) is the capital of the Karawang Regency of West Java, Indonesia. It is 32 miles east of Jakarta, and had a population of 307,880 at the 2020 Census, spread over two districts of the regency - West Karawang and East Karawang.  

Karawang is known as a major rice production source in West Java.

Karawang is also known for automobile manufacturing facilities, including Honda Prospect Motor and Toyota Motor Manufacturing Indonesia. Mitsubishi Motors Indonesia also operated a plant here from 1988 until 2015.

History
In March 2010 Karawang suffered severe flooding with 10,747 houses flooded; 11,540 families and 44,071 people were affected.

Heinrich Christian Macklot, a German naturalist, was killed on 12 May 1832 during an insurrection that took place on the island.

Toll road access

See also 
 San Diego Hills, a cemetery in West Karawang

References

 Karawang latitude and longitude
 karawangklik.com
 karawangportal.com

External links

 "Mujahiddin robes found in Karawang" The Jakarta Post

Populated places in West Java
Regency seats of West Java

no:Karawang
pl:Karawang